George Loring may refer to:

 George B. Loring (1817–1891), U.S. Representative from Massachusetts
 George F. Loring (1851–1918), Boston, Massachusetts architect

See also
 George Loring House, Somerville, Massachusetts